Lesbian, gay, bisexual, and transgender (LGBT) persons in Solomon Islands face legal challenges not experienced by non-LGBT residents. Male same-sex sexual activity is illegal, punishable by up to 14 years imprisonment, but the law is not enforced.

Legality of same-sex activity
Same-sex sexual activity has been illegal since its criminalisation in the 1880s.

Engaging in anal sex or oral sex with another person, whether heterosexual or homosexual, is punishable by up to 14 years imprisonment under Section 160, Chapter 26 of the Penal Code of Solomon Islands. Attempting anal or oral sex can be punished by up to seven years imprisonment. Acts of "gross indecency", even in private, can be punished with five years imprisonment. However, the United States Department of State reported that there were no reports in 2010, 2011, 2012, or 2013 of arrests or prosecutions directed at LGBT people.

It is advisable that gay and lesbian citizens and travellers avoid public displays of affection, which could be categorized by the Solomon Islands penal code as an act of gross indecency, a felony, liable to imprisonment for five years.

The Law Reform Commission proposed legalising gay and lesbian sexual activity in December 2008, but the move was strongly opposed. The government told the United Nations in 2011 that it had no intention of decriminalising homosexuality.

Recognition of same-sex relationships

Solomon Islands does not recognise same-sex unions in any form.

In 2017, in a speech to a local church group, Prime Minister Manasseh Sogavare stated his opposition to same-sex marriage.

In June 2018, Governor General Frank Kabui, while acknowledging the existence of LGBT people in Solomon Islands and stating that "It is not wrong to [be] born with gay or lesbian inclination, it is said to be biological and is beyond individual control", reiterated his opposition to same-sex marriage. He condemned any attempt to change the laws, justifying his position with reference to the criminal code that prohibits same-sex sexual activity and to the Bible on Christian religious grounds.

Discrimination protections
Solomon Islands is currently reforming its Constitution. In the first draft of 2009 of the new Constitution of the proposed Federal Democratic Republic of Solomon Islands, "sexual orientation" was explicitly and newly included as a prohibited ground of discrimination. In the 2011 draft and the 2013 draft, there was no mention of "sexual orientation". In the latest second 2014 draft (published on 6 May 2014), "sexual orientation" was not put as a prohibited ground of discrimination. As of 2019, the constitutional reform is still in the process.

Summary table

See also

Human rights in Solomon Islands
LGBT rights in Oceania

References

Law of the Solomon Islands
LGBT rights in the Solomon Islands
Solomon Islands